Carmen, officially the Municipality of Carmen, is a 1st class municipality in the province of Davao del Norte, Philippines. According to the 2020 census, it has a population of 82,018 people.

History
Carmen was once part of the undivided province of Davao. It was on by virtue of Republic Act 4745 enacted by the defunct Philippine Congress created the new municipality on June 18, 1966. Carmen, was named in memory of Doña Carmen Veloso, then wife of Congressman Ismael Veloso who was found his ancestors' roots Carmen, Cebu.

When the Philippines was shaken by World War II, Filipinos buckled down and joined military units that resisted the Japanese invaders. In Carmen, locals fought the war and drove away the Japanese army then stationed in Barangay Ising. The Veterans Memorial Shrine, just along the national highway, has a brief history and some of the names of those who participated, and has become a tourist attraction in Carmen.

Geography
Carmen has vast rice fields while its coastal areas provide fishermen a major source of livelihood such as mud crab fattening and fishing. Carmen is also a part of Davao Metropolitan Area.

Climate

Barangays
The municipality of Carmen is politically subdivided into 20 barangays, namely:

Demographics

Economy

Government
Elected officials of Carmen for the term of 2022-2025
Mayor: Leony Bahague
Vice Mayor: Marchell Perandos
Councilors:
Ramsi F. Adran
Rolando L. Estremos II
 Lynsiel C. Inso
Cornelio B. Cadayona II
Alberto L. Sarin
Cris John N. Lura
Roselyn Y. Buen
Angelita B. Camacho

References

External links
   Carmen Profile at the DTI Cities and Municipalities Competitive Index
 [ Philippine Standard Geographic Code]
 Philippine Census Information
 Local Governance
 Performance Management System

Municipalities of Davao del Norte